William Russel Huber (June 16, 1902 – January 25, 1982), a native of Harrisburg, Pennsylvania, was a United States Navy sailor who received the Medal of Honor for heroism on June 11, 1928.

Naval service
Huber enlisted in the United States Navy in Philadelphia, Pennsylvania on September 14, 1920.  He had risen to the rate of Machinist Mate First Class by the time he received the Medal of Honor in 1928.  

After receiving the Medal of Honor, Huber stayed in the Navy and served throughout World War II.  He was promoted to the warrant officer rank of machinist on 23 July 1942 and assigned to the repair ship USS Medusa stationed at Pearl Harbor.  He was promoted to lieutenant (junior grade) on 1 May 1943 and to lieutenant on 1 July 1944.  He retired from the Navy with the rank of Lieutenant on June 1, 1948.   In retirement he lived in San Mateo, California.

Death and burial
Huber died on January 25, 1982, and is buried in the Golden Gate National Cemetery in California.  (Despite his headstone listing his year of birth as 1903, all official documents related to Huber's Navy service give his year of birth as 1902.)

Medal of Honor citation
For display of extraordinary heroism in the line of his profession on 11 June 1928, after a boiler accident on the U.S.S. Bruce, then at the Naval Shipyard, Norfolk, Va. Immediately on becoming aware of the accident, Huber without hesitation and in complete disregard of his own safety, entered the steam-filled fireroom and at grave risk to his life succeeded by almost superhuman efforts in carrying Charles H. Byran to safety. Although having received severe and dangerous burns about the arms and neck, he descended with a view toward rendering further assistance. The great courage, grit, and determination displayed by Huber on this occasion characterized conduct far above and beyond the call of duty.

Awards
Medal of Honor
Good Conduct Medal
American Defense Service Medal
American Campaign Medal
Asiatic-Pacific Campaign Medal
World War II Victory Medal

See also

 List of Medal of Honor recipients

References

External links
 

United States Navy Medal of Honor recipients
People from Harrisburg, Pennsylvania
1903 births
1982 deaths
United States Navy sailors
United States Navy personnel of World War I
United States Navy personnel of World War II
Non-combat recipients of the Medal of Honor
Burials at Golden Gate National Cemetery
Military personnel from Pennsylvania